Rahul Sharma, better known as Rahul Kumar, is an Indian actor, model, film director and singer working in the Bollywood industry. Active since 2010 through his theater projects, Bollywood films, television commercials and television shows. He is known for his performances in 3 Idiots (2009), Student of the Year 2 (2019) and the 2020-web series Bandish Bandits.

Career 
Kumar began his theater career at the age of 3 and simultaneously acted in various child roles in Indian films like Omkara as Saif Ali Khan's son and The Blue Umbrella. Has also acted in Rajkumar Hirani's 3 Idiots and gained popularity from his character named Millimeter. He has also done advertisements with actors Amitabh Bachchan, Shah Rukh Khan, Abhishek Bachchan, Ranbir Kapoor and R. Balki.

Recently, he play the role of Kabir in the Amazon Prime web series named Bandish Bandits.

Filmography

Television

Advertisements

Notes

References 

Living people
Indian male film actors
Male actors in Hindi cinema
Year of birth missing (living people)
Indian male television actors